Jaksa Waterfall is a small waterfall in Bogor, West Java, Indonesia. Many tourists and visitors hike up the long pathway to reach this waterfall. It is located in a lowland rainforest near Taman Safari, a safari park.

Landforms of West Java
Waterfalls of Java
Tourist attractions in West Java